Jaroslava Slavíčková (born 9 December 1953) is a Czech former swimmer. She competed in three events at the 1972 Summer Olympics.

References

1953 births
Living people
Czech female swimmers
Olympic swimmers of Czechoslovakia
Swimmers at the 1972 Summer Olympics
Sportspeople from Prague